This is a summary of 1950 in music in the United Kingdom.

Events
9 March – UK premiere of Britten's Spring Symphony at the Royal Albert Hall, London, conducted by Eduard van Beinum.
September – Herbert Howells' Hymnus Paradisi receives its première at the Three Choirs Festival; the work had been written in 1938, shortly after the death of the composer's young son.
24 September – US musicologist Alan Lomax leaves for a tour of Europe, in the course of which he collects folk music from all over the UK, broadcasts on the BBC, and works with folklorists Peter Douglas Kennedy, Hamish Henderson, and Séamus Ennis, recording among others, Margaret Barry and the songs in Irish of Elizabeth Cronin; Scots ballad singer Jeannie Robertson; and Harry Cox of Norfolk.
Jazz musician John Dankworth forms the Dankworth Seven, with Jimmy Deuchar (trumpet), Eddie Harvey (trombone), Don Rendell (tenor sax), Bill Le Sage (piano), Eric Dawson (bass) and Tony Kinsey (drums).
Gracie Fields' radio show transfers from the BBC to Radio Luxembourg, where it is sponsored by Wisk soap powder.
Pianist Moura Lympany divorces her husband Colin Defries.
Harrison & Harrison begin work on a 7,866 pipe organ destined for the Royal Festival Hall, working to a design by Ralph Downes.

Classical music: new works
Malcolm Arnold – English Dances for orchestra, op. 27
Benjamin Britten – Lachrymae
Arnold Cooke – Trio for Violin, Viola and Cello
Vivian Ellis – Alpine Pastures
Arwel Hughes – Dewi Sant (Saint David) (oratorio)
Humphrey Searle – Poem for 22 Strings
William Walton – 2 Pieces for violin and piano
Grace Williams – Three Traditional Ballads
W. S. Gwynn Williams – Breuddwyd Glyndwr

Opera
Hugo Cole – Asses' Ears
Lawrance Collingwood – The Death of Tintagiles
Norman Demuth – The Oresteia
Brian Easdale – The Corn King (written in 1935)
Berthold Goldschmidt – Beatrice Cenci
Inglis Gundry – The Horses of the Dawn (not performed)
Elisabeth Lutyens – Penelope

Film and Incidental music
William Alwyn – State Secret, starring Douglas Fairbanks Jr., Jack Hawkins, Glynis Johns and Herbert Lom.
 Anthony Collins – Odette, starring Anna Neagle and Trevor Howard.
John Wooldridge – The Woman in Question directed by Anthony Asquith, starring Jean Kent, Dirk Bogarde and John McCallum.

Musical theatre
Noël Coward – Ace of Clubs
Harry Parr Davies – Dear Miss Phoebe
Ivor Novello – Gay's the Word
Sandy Wilson – Caprice

Musical films
 Come Dance with Me, featuring Anne Shelton and Anton Karas
 Dance Hall, starring Petula Clark and Diana Dors
 The Dancing Years, starring Dennis Price

Births
21 January – Billy Ocean (real name Leslie Charles), singer and songwriter
12 February – Steve Hackett, English singer-songwriter, guitarist, and producer (Genesis, Quiet World, and GTR)
24 February – Howard Griffiths, conductor
13 February — Peter Gabriel, singer and songwriter
19 February — Andy Powell, musician (Wishbone Ash)
9 March – Howard Shelley, pianist and conductor
10 March – Stephen Oliver, opera composer (died 1992 in British music)
20 April – Ray Hodson (Line Dance Instructor – UK)
22 April — Peter Frampton, singer and songwriter
3 May — Mary Hopkin, singer
13 May – Danny Kirwan, guitarist, singer and songwriter (Fleetwood Mac)
22 May — Bernie Taupin, songwriter
1 June – Tom Robinson, singer and songwriter
5 June – Barbara Gaskin, singer
23 June – Nicholas Cleobury, conductor
27 August – Neil Murray, bass guitarist
14 September – Paul Kossoff, guitarist (Free) (died 1976)
26 September – Simon Brint, comedy musician and composer (died 2011)
18 November – Graham Parker, singer-songwriter and guitarist (The Rumour)

Deaths
14 February – Robert Graham Manson, violinist, pianist and composer, 66
26 February – Sir Harry Lauder, singer, comedian and songwriter, 79
19 April – Gerald Tyrwhitt-Wilson, 14th Baron Berners, composer, writer and artist, 66
13 May – Bruno Siegfried Huhn, organist and composer, 78
6 June – Alfred Edward Moffat, composer and collector of music, 86
28 June – H. Balfour Gardiner, musician, composer and teacher, 72 (stroke)
14 October – Florence Aylward, composer, 88
26 October – Evelyn Suart, pianist, 69
19 November – Thomas Wood, composer, 57 (heart attack)
23 November – Percival Mackey, pianist, composer and bandleader, 56
1 December – Ernest John Moeran, composer, 55 (cerebral haemorrhage)
23 December – John Rippiner Heath, violinist and composer, 63
25 December – Edward d'Evry, organist and composer, 81
"date unknown" – Kate Carney, singer and comedian, 80

See also
 1950 in British television
 1950 in the United Kingdom
 List of British films of 1950

References

 
British Music, 1950 In
British music by year